is a concert hall in Sakyō-ku, Kyoto, Japan. It opened in 1995 as part of the 1200th anniversary celebrations of the foundation of Heian-kyō. The shoebox-style Main Hall seats 1833 and the Ensemble Hall Murata 500. Arata Isozaki was the architect, with acoustical design by Nagata Acoustics.

See also

 Kyoto Kaikan
 Minami-za
 Shimogamo Shrine

References

External links
 Homepage
 Kyoto Symphony Orchestra

Buildings and structures in Kyoto
Tourist attractions in Kyoto
Concert halls in Japan
Arata Isozaki buildings